Walter Ellis Mosley (born January 12, 1952) is an American novelist, most widely recognized for his crime fiction. He has written a series of best-selling historical mysteries featuring the hard-boiled detective Easy Rawlins, a black private investigator living in the Watts neighborhood of Los Angeles, California; they are perhaps his most popular works. In 2020, Mosley received the National Book Foundation Medal for Distinguished Contribution to American Letters, making him the first Black man to receive the honor.

Personal life
Mosley was born in California. His mother, Ella (born Slatkin), was Jewish and worked as a personnel clerk; her ancestors had immigrated from Russia. His father, Leroy Mosley (1924–1993), was an African American from Louisiana who was a supervising custodian at a Los Angeles public school. He had worked as a clerk in the segregated US army during the Second World War. His parents tried to marry in 1951 but, though the union was legal in California, where they were living, no one would give them a marriage license.

Mosley was an only child, and ascribes his writing imagination to "an emptiness in my childhood that I filled up with fantasies". For $9.50 a week, he attended the Victory Baptist day school, a private African-American elementary school that held pioneering classes in black history. When he was 12, his parents moved from South Central to the more comfortable, working-class west LA. He graduated from Alexander Hamilton High School in 1970.  Mosley describes his father as a deep thinker and storyteller, a "black Socrates". His mother encouraged him to read European classics from Dickens and Zola to Camus. He also loves Langston Hughes and Gabriel García Márquez. He was largely raised in a non-political family culture, although there were racial conflicts flaring throughout L.A. at the time. He later became more highly politicised and outspoken about racial inequalities in the US, which are a context of much of his fiction.

Mosley went through a "long-haired hippie" phase, drifting around Santa Cruz and Europe. He dropped out of Goddard College, a liberal arts college in Plainfield, Vermont, and then earned a political science degree at Johnson State College. Abandoning a doctorate in political theory, he started work programming computers. He moved to New York in 1981 and met the dancer and choreographer Joy Kellman, whom he married in 1987. They separated 10 years later and were divorced in 2001. While working for Mobil Oil, Mosley took a writing course at City College in Harlem after being inspired by Alice Walker's book The Color Purple. One of his tutors there, Edna O'Brien, became a mentor and encouraged him, saying: "You're Black, Jewish, with a poor upbringing; there are riches therein."

Mosley still resides in New York City.

He says that he identifies as both African-American and Jewish, with strong feelings for both groups.

Career
Mosley started writing at 34 and claims to have written every day since, penning more than forty books and often publishing two books a year. He has written in a variety of fiction categories, including mystery and afrofuturist science fiction, as well as nonfiction politics. His work has been translated into 21 languages.  His direct inspirations include the detective fiction of  Dashiell Hammett, Graham Greene and Raymond Chandler. Mosley's fame increased in 1992 when presidential candidate Bill Clinton, a fan of murder mysteries, named Mosley as one of his favorite authors. Mosley made publishing history in 1997 by foregoing an advance to give the manuscript of Gone Fishin'  to a small, independent publisher, Black Classic Press in Baltimore, run by former Black Panther Paul Coates.

His first published book, Devil in a Blue Dress, was the basis of a 1995 movie starring Denzel Washington, and the following year a 10-part abridgement of the novel by Margaret Busby, read by Paul Winfield, was broadcast on BBC Radio 4. The world premiere of Mosley's first play, The Fall of Heaven, was staged at the Playhouse in the Park, Cincinnati, Ohio, in January 2010.

Mosley has served on the board of directors of the National Book Awards. He is on the board of the TransAfrica Forum.

Former literature professor Harold Heft argued for Mosley's inclusion in the literary canon of Jewish-American writers. In Moment magazine, Johanna Neuman writes that black literary circles questioned whether Mosley should be considered a "black author". Mosley has said that he prefers to be called a novelist. He explains his desire to write about "black male heroes" saying "hardly anybody in America has written about black male heroes... There are black male protagonists and black male supporting characters, but nobody else writes about black male heroes."

In 2019, after working in the writers room for the series Snowfall, Mosley was hired by Alex Kurtzman for a similar role on the third season of Star Trek: Discovery. After working on the series for three weeks, Mosley was notified by CBS of a complaint made against him by another member of the writers room for Mosley's use of the word "nigger" while telling a story about his experience with a police officer who had used the slur. CBS told Mosley this was usually a fireable offence, but said no further action would be taken and asked that he not use the word again outside of a script. Mosley chose to leave the series, quitting without informing Kurtzman, and explained his decision in an op-ed for The New York Times in September 2019. He did not identify Discovery as the series he was working on in the op-ed, but this was confirmed in reports on the op-ed shortly after its release.

Awards and honors 
 1996 – Black Caucus of the American Library Association's Literary Award for RL's Dream
 1996 – O. Henry Award for a Socrates Fortlow story.
 1998 - Anisfield Wolf Award, for works that increase the appreciation and understanding of race in America.
 2001 – Grammy Award for Best Album Notes for Richard Pryor's …And It's Deep Too!
 2004 – Honorary doctorate from the City College of New York.
 2005 – "Risktaker Award" from the Sundance Institute for both his creative and activist efforts.
 2006 – First recipient of the Carl Brandon Society Parallax Award for his young adult novel 47.
 2007– NAACP Image Award for Outstanding Literary Work, Fiction, for Blonde Faith.
 2009– NAACP Image Award for Outstanding Literary Work, Fiction, for The Long Fall. 
 2013 – Inducted into the New York Writers Hall of Fame.
 2014 – NAACP Image Award-nominated for Outstanding Literary Work, Fiction, for Little Green: An Easy Rawlins Mystery.
 2014 – Langston Hughes Medal from the City College of New York.
 2016 – Named Grand Master by the Mystery Writers of America (see Edgar Award).
 2019 – Edgar Award for Best Novel for Down the River Unto the Sea.
 2020 – National Book Foundation Medal for Distinguished Contribution to American Letters
 2021 – NAACP Image Award for Outstanding Literary Work – Fiction, The Awkward Black Man.

Works

Novels 
RL's Dream (1995)
Blue Light (1998)
Futureland: Nine Stories of an Imminent World (2001)
The Man in My Basement (2004)
Walking the Line (2005), a novella in the Transgressions series
The Wave (2005)
47 (2005)
Fortunate Son (2006)
Killing Johnny Fry: A Sexistential Novel (2006)
Diablerie (2007)
The Tempest Tales (2008)
The Last Days of Ptolemy Grey (2010)
Parishioner (2012)
Debbie Doesn't Do It Anymore (2014)
 Inside a Silver Box (2015)
John Woman (2018)
 Down the River unto the Sea (2018), a standalone mystery
The Awkward Black Man (2020)
 Every Man a King (2023)

Easy Rawlins mysteries
Devil in a Blue Dress (1990)
A Red Death (1991)
White Butterfly (1992)
Black Betty (1994)
A Little Yellow Dog (1996)
Gone Fishin''' (1997)Bad Boy Brawly Brown (2002)Six Easy Pieces (2003)Little Scarlet (2004)Cinnamon Kiss (2005)Blonde Faith (2007)Little Green (2013)Rose Gold (2014)Charcoal Joe (2016)Blood Grove (2021)

Fearless Jones mysteriesFearless Jones (2001)Fear Itself (2003)Fear of the Dark (2006)

Leonid McGill mysteriesThe Long Fall (2009)Known to Evil (2010)When the Thrill Is Gone (2011)All I Did Was Shoot My Man (2012)And Sometimes I Wonder About You (2015)Trouble Is What I Do (2020)

Socrates Fortlow booksAlways Outnumbered, Always Outgunned (1997)Walkin' the Dog (1999)The Right Mistake (2008)

Crosstown to OblivionThe Gift of Fire / On the Head of a Pin (2012)Merge / Disciple (2012)Stepping Stone / The Love Machine (2013)

Graphic novelsMaximum Fantastic Four (2005, with Stan Lee and Jack Kirby)The Thing: The Next Big Thing (2022, with Tom Reilly)

PlaysThe Fall of Heaven (2011)Lift (2014)

NonfictionWorkin' on the Chain Gang: Shaking off the Dead Hand of History (2000)What Next: An African American Initiative Toward World Peace (2003)Life Out of Context: Which Includes a Proposal for the Non-violent Takeover of the House of Representatives (2006)This Year You Write Your Novel (2007)Twelve Steps Toward Political Revelation (2011) Elements of Fiction (2019)

Films and televisionFallen Angels: Fearless (1995) (TV)Devil in a Blue Dress (1995)Always Outnumbered (1998) (TV)
"Little Brother", episode of Masters of Science Fiction (2007) (TV)Snowfall (TV), consulting producer, episode writer: "Prometheus Rising" (2018)Star Trek: Discovery (2019) (TV)The Last Days of Ptolemy Grey (2022), executive producer

References

 Further reading 
Berger, Roger A., "'The Black Dick': Race, Sexuality, and Discourse in the L.A. Novels of Walter Mosley", in African American Review 31 (Summer 1997): 281–94.
Berrettini, Mark, "Private Knowledge, Public Space: Investigation and Navigation in Devil in a Blue Dress", in Cinema Journal 39 (Fall 1999): 74–89.
Brady, Owen E., ed., Conversations with Walter Mosley (Jackson: University Press of Mississippi, 2011).
Brady, Owen E. and Maus, Derek C., eds, Finding a Way Home: A Critical Assessment of Walter Mosley's Fiction (Jackson: University Press of Mississippi, 2008).
Fine, David, ed., Los Angeles in Fiction: A Collection of Essays from James M. Cain to Walter Mosley (Albuquerque: University of New Mexico, 1995).
Freiburger, William, "James Ellroy, Walter Mosley, and the Politics of the Los Angeles Crime Novel", in Clues: A Journal of Detection 17 (Fall–Winter 1996): 87–104.
Gruesser, John C., "An Un-Easy Relationship: Walter Mosley's Signifyin(g) Detective and the Black Community," in Confluences: Postcolonialism, African American Literary Studies, and the Black Atlantic (Athens: University of Georgia Press, 2007), 58–72.
Larson, Jennifer E., Understanding Walter Mosley (Columbia: University of South Carolina Press, 2016).
Lennard, John, Walter Mosley, Devil in a Blue Dress (Tirril: Humanities-Ebooks, 2007).
Wesley, Marilyn C., "Power and Knowledge in Walter Mosley’s Devil in a Blue Dress", in African American Review 35 (Spring 2001): 103–16.
Wilson, Charles E., Jr., Walter Mosley: A Critical Companion'' (Westport, CT, & London: Greenwood Press, 2003)

External links

 Official website
 
 Powell Books interview of Walter Mosley
 
 New Yorker profile. "Covering Mosley: The books of Walter Mosley: 19 January 2004
 A radio interview with Walter Mosley Aired on the Lewis Burke Frumkes Radio Show on 2 April 2011.
 

1952 births
20th-century African-American writers
20th-century American Jews
20th-century American male writers
20th-century American novelists
20th-century American short story writers
21st-century African-American writers
21st-century American Jews
21st-century American male writers
21st-century American novelists
21st-century American short story writers
African-American Jews
African-American male actors
African-American male writers
African-American novelists
Afrofuturist writers
American male actors
American male novelists
American male short story writers
American mystery writers
American people of Russian-Jewish descent
American science fiction writers
Black speculative fiction authors
City College of New York alumni
Goddard College alumni
Grammy Award winners
Jewish American male actors
Jewish American novelists
Johnson State College alumni
Living people
Nero Award winners
Novelists from California
Shamus Award winners
Edgar Award winners